Szymon Szewczyk (born December 21, 1982) is a Polish professional basketball player for Anwil Włocławek of the PLK. of the Polish Basketball League (PLK). Standing at 6'9, he plays both the power forward / center positions.

Early life
Born in Szczecin, Szewczyk grew up with PKK Szczecin's youth teams. He has been a member of the Polish Junior National Team, the Polish Under-20 National Team and the Polish “B” National Team. He currently is a member of the Polish National Team.

Basketball career
After playing two successful seasons in his native Poland, Szewczyk was evaluated by several top teams in Europe before signing with Braunschweig of Germany’s top division (Bundesliga I) for the 2002-03 season. Many considered him at the time as the best prospect from Poland in his age group.

Highlights
 1999–2000: SKK Szczecin - In his first full season with Szczecin, Szewczyk averaged 13.1 points and 5.0 rebounds.
 2000–2001: SKK Szczecin - Szewczyk improved his numbers across the board in his second season with Szczecin. Averaged 14.1 points, 7.4 rebounds and showed a three-point touch with 14 three-pointers (48.3%).
 2001–2002: Polpharma Starogard Gdański
 2002–2003: TXU Energie Braunschweig - Szewczyk delivered a very solid performance in his first season in Germany. Averaged 12.3 points, 6.3 rebounds and 1.07 blocked shots (4th in league). Erupted for 27 points (8-for-12 shooting from two-point range) and added seven rebounds vs. Trier. Posted a double-double with 11 points and 10 rebounds vs. Cologne. Scored 14 points and added five rebounds, four steals and three blocked shots in a win over X-Rays Würzburg.
 2003–2005: Alba Berlin
 2005–2006: Olimpija Ljubljana
 2006–2007: Scafati Basket
 2007–2009: Lokomotiv Rostov
 2009–2011: Air Avellino
 2011–2013: Reyer Venezia Mestre
 2014: Pallacanestro Virtus Roma
 2014–2015: AZS Koszalin
 2015–2016: Basket Zielona Góra
 2016–2017: BM Slam Ostrów Wielkopolski - Signed on September 23, 2016.
 2017–2020: KK Włocławek
 2020–2021: GTK Gliwice
 2021–present: KK Włocławek

NBA
On June 26, 2003, Szewczyk was selected by the Milwaukee Bucks with the 35th pick of the 2003 NBA draft. On 2009, he joined the Bucks for the Las Vegas Summer League.

On July 11, 2013, the Oklahoma City Thunder acquired Szewczyk's rights in a three team deal with Milwaukee and the Minnesota Timberwolves.

As of 2022, Szewcyzk has yet to play in an NBA game despite being drafted nearly 20 years ago.

Personal life
His father Miroslaw Szewczyk was a professional basketball player for more than 20 years in Szczecin.

References

External links
NBA.com - Draft 2003
Legabasket.it Profile

1982 births
Living people
Alba Berlin players
AZS Koszalin players
Basket Zielona Góra players
Basketball Löwen Braunschweig players
Centers (basketball)
KK Olimpija players
KK Włocławek players
Milwaukee Bucks draft picks
Pallacanestro Virtus Roma players
PBC Lokomotiv-Kuban players
Polish expatriate basketball people in Germany
Polish expatriate basketball people in Italy
Polish men's basketball players
Power forwards (basketball)
Reyer Venezia players
S.S. Felice Scandone players
Scafati Basket players
Sportspeople from Szczecin
Stal Ostrów Wielkopolski players